Kyperounta is a town in Cyprus. It lies at an altitude of 1,140 meters. With a population in approximately 1,500 it can be called the head-town of Pitsilia. The town took its name from the plant Cyperus rotundus (kyperos). Kyperounda was established during the Byzantine period. At historical documents was called "Chiperonda".

References

External links

Newsreel dating from 1955 showing British soldiers rounding up villagers and searching the village for arms during the EOKA struggle

Communities in Limassol District